The Scotland cricket team toured the Netherlands in May 2021 to play two One Day International (ODI) matches in Rotterdam. Due to the impact of the COVID-19 pandemic, the Netherlands last played an ODI match in June 2019, and Scotland's last ODI match was in December 2019. Originally, the second ODI was scheduled to be played on 21 May, but the fixture was brought forward by one day after bad weather was forecast.

The Netherlands won the first ODI by 14 runs. Scotland won the second ODI by 6 wickets, to draw the series 1–1.

Squads

ODI series

1st ODI

2nd ODI

References

External links
 Series home at ESPN Cricinfo

2021 in Scottish cricket
2021 in Dutch cricket
International cricket competitions in 2021
Scottish cricket tours abroad